USS Charles R. Greer (DE-23) was an  constructed for the United States Navy during World War II. She was promptly sent off into the Pacific Ocean to protect convoys and other ships from Japanese submarines and fighter aircraft. At the end of the war, she returned to the United States with two battle stars.
 
She was intended for Great Britain under Lend-Lease as BDE-23. However, Charles R. Greer was retained for American use and reclassified DE-23; launched 18 January 1943 by Mare Island Navy Yard; sponsored by Mrs. E. Greer; and commissioned 25 June 1943.

Namesake
USS Charles R. Greer was named for Charles Rogers Greer (10 July 1920 – 14 April 1942) who was born in Turtle Creek, Pennsylvania, United States. He enlisted in the US Marine Corps in 1938. As a private first class he was on duty in the Philippines at the opening of World War II, where he was awarded a Silver Star during the defense of Corregidor, becoming the first Marine to be awarded an army decoration in World War II, and the first to be mentioned in dispatches.

World War II Pacific Theatre operations  
Charles R. Greer's assignment in the U.S. Pacific Fleet was to the never-ending task of escorting convoys in the intricate meshing of movements demanded by the buildup of Pacific bases. She cleared San Francisco, California, on the first such mission 5 September 1943, bound for Pearl Harbor, Hawaii, which was to be her base until October 1944.

Her escort duty took her to west coast ports, to Funafuti in the Ellice Islands, and to the Gilberts and Marshalls. Early in December 1943 she formed part of the screen for the transports bringing the garrison force to Abemama in the Gilberts, where an important air base was soon developed. The next month she guarded the movement of the garrison for Majuro.

Under attack by Japanese aircraft  
From October 1944 through February 1945, Charles R. Greer operated guarding convoys from Ulithi to Eniwetok, Guam, and Pearl Harbor. On 20 November 1944, her group came under attack by a lone enemy aircraft off Ulithi, but the fire of Charles R. Greer and the other escort vessels drove the Japanese plane off. She returned to Pearl Harbor from a west coast overhaul in April 1945, and took up a full schedule of training activities until late June, when she returned to the Marshall Islands for anti-submarine patrols, and convoy escort duty.

End-of-War operations 
She left Eniwetok on 31 August to sail to Wake Island, where on 4 September she took part in the surrender ceremonies.

Post-War Decommissioning 
She sailed on to Pearl Harbor, where she was decommissioned 2 November 1945 and sold 1 February 1947.

Awards

References

External links 

 

 

Evarts-class destroyer escorts
Ships built in Vallejo, California
World War II frigates and destroyer escorts of the United States
1943 ships